Edward Chang is a Taiwanese electrical engineer from National Chiao Tung University in Hsinchu, Taiwan.

Chang was named a Fellow of the Institute of Electrical and Electronics Engineers (IEEE) in 2017 for his contributions to compound semiconductor heterojunction transistor technologies''.

References

20th-century births
Living people
Taiwanese electrical engineers
Academic staff of the National Chiao Tung University
Fellow Members of the IEEE
Year of birth missing (living people)
Place of birth missing (living people)